Esmâ Ibret Hanim (born 1780) was an Ottoman calligrapher and poet, noted as the most successful female calligrapher of her day.

Life and work 
In the 18th-century Ottoman period, calligraphy was a male-dominated profession. However, a small number of female calligraphers, such as Esmâ Ibret and Şerife Fatma, successfully trained as calligraphers and were able to make valuable contributions in their field.

Esmâ Ibret Hanim  was born in Istanbul in 1194 (1780). Her father was Serhasekiyan-i hassa Ahmed Ağa, an official in the Royal Palace. She was an only child, and special attention was given to her education. From early childhood she showed an interest in calligraphy, writing in sülüs-nesih and icâzet and copying the work of Mahmud Celâleddin Efendi. Her father liked to trick his friends by showing her work and then watching his friends' amazed responses when they were told that his daughter was the scribe.

At the age of 10, her father sent her to Sheikh Murad Derwish Lodge where she studied with the leading calligraphers of the day, including Zühdi, İbrahim Şefik and Mahmud Celaleddin. By the age of 15, her talent was widely recognised amongst family and friends. When she was aged 16, she was given the title of "Ibret" which indicated that she has mastered her lessons.

Her calligraphy master, Mahmud Celâleddin was initially reluctant to take on a female student. However, he was shown a book prepared by Esmâ Ibret, and deemed it to be so good and so uncharacteristically "female" that at first he did not believe it was her work. On investigation however, he was persuaded of her talent and accepted her as a pupil. Esmâ Ibret and Mahmud Celaleddin subsequently married, in spite of an age gap of some 30 years. Her husband worked on revising the scripts, and developing new scripts such as  "celi sülüs". However, Esmâ Ibret followed in the traditional style of Hâfiz Osman, producing elegant work in the sülüs-nesih script.

She wrote a hilye that was presented to Selim III and his mother, who were so impressed that they arranged for a grant of 500 Kuruş and a daily allowance of 500 Akçes, to be paid by the Customs Office.

Both she and her husband lived long and productive lives. Her date of death is uncertain, but has been estimated at 1830. She is buried by her husband in the Murad-ı Buhari Dergâhı, Vefa, Istanbul.

Work

She is generally regarded as the finest female calligrapher of her era, and the first female to become a professional calligrapher. Her work is only partially documented. Problems associated with attribution have been exacerbated by the absence of any signature. Female calligraphers, especially, were expected to show humility and did not always sign their work. Recent scholarship, however, has uncovered previously unknown examples of her work. In addition, works that were previously attributed to her husband have now been attributed to Esmâ Ibret Hanim.

Examples of İbret's work can be found in the Topkapı Palace Museum. Other examples of her work include:<ref>Kazan,  H., Dünden  Bugüne  Hanım  Hattatlar  (Female  Calligraphers  Past  And Present), Istanbul: İstanbul Büyükşehir Belediyesi, 2010</ref>

 Hilye-i Sharīf, gift for the Vālide Sultan (queen mother), now at the Topkapi Palace Museum
 Hilye-i Sharīf, dated 1209/1795, now at the Turkish and Islamic Arts Museum
 Alif juzu (Arabic alphabet), dated 1213/1798-99 at the Ekrem Hakki Ayverdi Collection
 Dalāil-i Hayrāt now at Istanbul University Library
 Qit'a, dated 1222/1807, now at the Ekrem Hakki Ayverdi Collection
 Qit'a'', undated, now at the Saffet Tanman Collection

See also 
 Culture of the Ottoman Empire
 Islamic calligraphy
 List of Ottoman calligraphers
 Ottoman art

References 

1780 births
18th-century artists from the Ottoman Empire
Calligraphers from the Ottoman Empire
Ottoman culture
Women calligraphers
Year of death missing